Guillaume Fanucchi (born 21 May 1995) is a French professional footballer who currently plays for AC Ajaccio as a striker. A product of the club's youth system, he made his senior debut on 1 May 2015, playing 79 minutes of the 0–2 defeat to Nancy at the Stade Marcel Picot before being replaced by Jordi Quintillà.

Career statistics

External links
 Guillaume Fanucchi at foot-national.com
 
 
 

1995 births
Living people
French footballers
Association football forwards
AC Ajaccio players
Ligue 2 players